Ak-Saray Palace is a ruined palace and historic site in Shahrisabz, Uzbekistan. The palace was built at the beginning of the Timurid period, between 1380 and 1404, under the reign of Timur. In 2000, the palace was declared a UNESCO World Heritage Site.

History
Timur was born near Kesh, as Shahrisabz was then called, and wanted to make the city the capital of his empire instead of Samarkand. So he had a mighty palace built here. Construction of the castle began in 1380 and lasted 24 years until 1404, just before Timur's death.

In the 16th century, Shahrisabz along with Ak-Saray Castle were destroyed by the forces of Abdullah Khan II, the Khan of Bukhara. After Uzbekistan gained independence, conservation works were carried out between 1994 and 1998. A colossal statue of Timur was erected on a high pedestal on the original site of the palace.

Architecture
The remains Ak-Saray Palace lie to the north of the historic center of Shahrisabz in a park near the north gate in the city walls. The facade is decorated with large patterns of ocher and dark blue and light blue glazed bricks. A scroll bears the inscription "God prolong the Sultan's days." It was surrounded by buildings, one of which is said to have been six stories high. The number and size of other farms could not be determined due to destruction in the 16th century.

Notes

References

Buildings and structures completed in 1604
Shahrisabz
Archaeological sites in Uzbekistan
Palaces in Uzbekistan
Islamic architecture